Alma Qeramixhi (born November 9, 1963 in Korçë) is an Albanian heptathlete who represented her country in the 1992 Summer Olympics.  She competed in the women's heptathlon

In 1989, she set the Albanian record for the 100 m. hurdles event which she still holds. She also set in 1990 the Albanian record in heptathlon, which she also still holds.

References

External links
Profile
Albanian records in athletics

1963 births
Living people
Albanian heptathletes
Olympic athletes of Albania
Athletes (track and field) at the 1992 Summer Olympics
Sportspeople from Korçë
Albanian female hurdlers